Repsol Honda is the official factory team of the Honda Racing Corporation in the MotoGP class of Grand Prix motorcycle racing (World Championship road racing), backed by principal sponsor Repsol.

History

1990s
In  the team entered a three rider lineup with Mick Doohan, Àlex Crivillé and Shinichi Ito riding the Honda NSR500. Doohan won the World Championship for the second time in a row in Argentina, with one race left for the end of the season with seven race wins, Crivillé finished the season fourth with one race win while Ito finished fifth overall. Doohan won his third World Championship with eight race wins and Crivillé finished runner-up with two wins. Okada finished seventh and Ito twelfth.

Repsol Honda won all 15 races of the season with Doohan winning twelve races, and breaking Giacomo Agostini's record for victories in one season, on his way to his fourth World Championship. Okada finished runner-up with a race win, Crivillé finished fourth with two wins but had to miss five races after a serious crash at Assen while Aoki finished fifth overall. Repsol Honda riders took all of the podium positions at four events, in Japan, Spain, Germany and Indonesia.

For , Doohan, Crivillé and Okada continued with the team riding the NSR500 and Sete Gibernau joined them riding the NSR500V. Doohan continued to dominate the championship with eight wins and was crowned World Champion for the fifth time in Australia, in front of his home fans and with one race left in the season. Crivillé finished third overall with two wins, while Okada had to miss three races after breaking his wrist during practice of the Italian Grand Prix and finished eighth overall. Gibernau finished eleventh.

During qualifying for the Spanish Grand Prix, Doohan had a serious crash and ultimately caused his retirement from the sport. Crivillé went on to win six races and clinch the World Championship in Rio de Janeiro with one race left in the season. Okada finished third overall with three race wins. Gibernau – who started the season on the NSR500V before replacing Doohan on the NSR500 – finished fifth overall. The team managed an all Repsol Honda riders podium at Catalunya with Crivillé first, Okada second and Gibernau third.

2000s
Crivillé, Okada and Gibernau remained with the team for  all on NSR500 motorcycles.  was a difficult year for the Repsol Honda Team, as Crivillé only got one win and finished ninth overall, Okada finished eleventh and Gibernau fifteenth. In , Crivillé was joined by Tohru Ukawa.

In , the debut year of the new MotoGP class, Valentino Rossi joined the team alongside Ukawa riding the new Honda RC211V, the only two riders to use the new motorcycle until near the end of the season when Alex Barros and Daijiro Kato were also given the RC211V. Rossi dominated the season and with eleven race wins become World Champion with four races left for the end of the season. Rossi with nine wins and finishing on the podium at all the races, became World Champion for the third time in a row with two races left in the season. Hayden finished fifth overall with two podium finishes.

Barros finished the season fourth with four podiums and Hayden eighth with two podiums. Both riders got podium finishes but no race wins. For  Max Biaggi joined Hayden in the team's line-up. Hayden got his first MotoGP win in his home race, the United States Grand Prix, he finished third overall. Biaggi was fifth with four podiums.

For , Hayden was joined by 250cc World Champion Dani Pedrosa. Hayden led the championship for most of the season but at the Portuguese Grand Prix, Pedrosa recklessly crashed into him. Both riders were out of the race and Rossi took the championship lead with one race left to go. In the last race of the season, Rossi fell off his motorcycle on lap 5 trying to make up for a poor start. Hayden had a conservative race finishing a safe 3rd and thus became World Champion. He got two race wins and eight other podium finishes. Pedrosa finished fifth with two race wins and six other podium finishes.

The team used the new 800cc Honda RC212V. The new motorcycle did not have the expected success right away but later in the season the motorcycle was improved. Pedrosa got two race wins and finished the season runner up, while Hayden could only manage three podium finishes and finished the season eighth overall. For , Pedrosa and Hayden made up the rider line-up, with Mike Leitner and Pete Benson as Pedrosa and Hayden's chief mechanics, respectively, and Kazuhiko Yamano as team manager. During the season Pedrosa switched to Bridgestone tyres and a wall was placed between the garages of Pedrosa and Hayden to prevent observation of tyre data. A wall between the same team's garages was first instituted by Rossi at the beginning of the season between himself and his teammate on Michelins, Jorge Lorenzo.

For , Pedrosa and Andrea Dovizioso were the team riders.

2010s
For , the HRC Team Director was Kazuhiko Yamano, overseeing all operations including the factory teams and satellite teams. Toshiyuki Yamaji replaced Yamano as Team Manager and directed the entire Repsol Honda team. Alberto Puig was the Pedrosa Team Manager and Gianni Berti was the Dovizioso Team Manager. Shinichi Kokubu was the Grand Prix Technical Director, overseeing the six RC212V machines in MotoGP.

For , Shuhei Nakamoto was HRC Vice President and directed all Honda MotoGP teams. Shinichi Kokubu was Technical Director, and Livio Suppo was HRC Communication and marketing director. Pedrosa, Dovizioso and Casey Stoner were the team riders. The team also had sponsorship from PT Astra Honda Motor, through their One Heart. and Satu Hati. brands. For , Pedrosa and Stoner were the team riders. For , Pedrosa continued to ride for the team while Marc Márquez was his team-mate, with Suppo as the Team Principal. The team lost their One Heart. and Satu Hati. sponsorship.

In , Márquez became the youngest rider to win ten successive races in MotoGP. The team's One Heart. and Satu Hati. sponsorship returned. For , Pedrosa and Márquez remained with the team. Red Bull, a long-term sponsor that was seen on the riders' helmets, became a main sponsor for the team.

Jorge Lorenzo signed a two-year deal with Repsol Honda to be a factory rider until the end of 2020 season although he retired at the end of 2019 to be replaced by Alex Márquez. He replaced Dani Pedrosa, who retired following the 2018 MotoGP season and signed with KTM for a test rider role in the succeeding years.

2020s

Alex Márquez finished on the podium twice in 2020, scoring two second-place finishes in the 2020 French motorcycle Grand Prix and the 2020 Aragon motorcycle Grand Prix.

Marc Márquez returned to Repsol Honda for  after not competing in the 2020 season due to an injury, Pol Espargaró also signed for the season leaving Red Bull KTM Factory Racing at the end of 2020.

In , Pol Espargaró joined Tech3 GasGas Factory Racing. He was replaced by  MotoGP World Champion Joan Mir.

Grand Prix motorcycle results
(key) (Races in bold indicate pole position; races in italics indicate fastest lap)

MotoGP results

By rider

By year

Notes

References

External links

 http://world.honda.com/MotoGP Official Honda website for motorcycle grand prix teams
 http://world.honda.com/HRC/repsolhondateam/index.html

Motorcycle racing teams
Motorsport in Japan
Motorsport in England
Aalst, Belgium
Red Bull sports teams
h
Motorcycle racing teams established in 1995
1995 establishments in Japan

ms:Repsol Honda